A meadery is a winery or brewery that produces honey wines or meads, and which sells them commercially.  There are craft ‘’’meaderies’’’ emerging all over North America, Canada, Australia and New Zealand where each meadery produces excellent yet quite different styles of meads, from Fruit meads and Traditional meads, to Session meads and Braggots (Mead-Beer Hybrids) 

Meaderies that produce honey wines or meads are becoming more abundant in the US. According to a study by the American Mead Maker Association, the community of mead producers has exploded 130% since 2011, making it the fastest growing alcoholic beverage category in the US.

Meaderies are becoming more commonplace around the world as people start to discover their offerings.

In Cornwall, U.K., a meadery can also refer to a type of restaurant that serves mead and food with a medieval ambience. An ancient meadery is thought to be in the style of a banquet hall, having wooden flooring, heavy wooden tables, and lit by candlelight with white-painted granite walls.

References 

Mead
Restaurants by type
Cornish cuisine